is a 1967 Japanese chambara film directed by Satsuo Yamamoto and starring Shintaro Katsu as the blind masseur Zatoichi. It was originally released by the Daiei Motion Picture Company (later acquired by Kadokawa Pictures), and is the first film produced by Katsu Productions (Katsu's own company).

Zatoichi the Outlaw is the sixteenth episode in the 26-part film series devoted to the character of Zatoichi.

Plot

In a rural village, Zatoichi (Katsu) encounters Shushi Ohara (Suzuki; modeled after 18th-century agriculturalist Yagaku Ohara) a sword-less rōnin who defends himself against multiple attackers without killing them. Ohara leads a peasant movement advocating the abstention from gambling, drinking, and whoring.

Cast
Shintaro Katsu as Zatoichi
Rentarō Mikuni as Boss Asagoro
Kō Nishimura as Suga
Yuko Hamada as Oshino
Toshiyuki Hosokawa as Nisaburo
Takuya Fujioka as Zatosanji
Kenjiro Ishiyama as Tatsugoro
Tatsuo Endo as Boss Tomizo
Kayo Mikimoto as Oyuki
Tatsuo Matsushita as Yamagen
Mizuho Suzuki as Shushi Ohara

Reception

In a contemporary review, "Chie." of Variety noted that this Zatoichi film was given a big name director Satuso Yamamoto and a well known actor Rentarō Mikuni which made the film "inflated [...] which, by comparison with the others, not very entertaining."

J. Doyle Wallis, in a review for DVD Talk, wrote that "[t]his film has one of the better plots in the series, the almost hippie ex-samurai's teaching posing as a threat to the gangsters who prefer the villagers to lead debauched lives. Unfortunately some of the storytelling is sloppy, particularly the side-plot characters who Ichi becomes involved with. Their introductions and back story were told so quickly and incidentally, that when their stories began to get a third act wrap up, I had trouble recalling who they were in the first place."

References

External links

Zatoichi the Outlaw (1967), review by D. Trull for Lard Biscuit Enterprises
Zatoichi the Outlaw (1967), review by Steve Kopian for Unseen Films (18 February 2014)
Review: Zatoichi the Outlaw (1967), by Thomas Raven for freakengine (March 2012)
REVIEW: Zatoichi 16 – Zatoichi the Outlaw (1967), by Mark Pollard for Kung Fu Cinema
Zatoichi the Outlaw, review by Rob Larsen for DrunkenFist.com (2014)

Japanese adventure films
1967 films
Zatoichi films
Daiei Film films
Films set in Japan
Films shot in Japan
Films produced by Masaichi Nagata
1960s Japanese films